Aberbechan was formerly a township in  the parish of Llanllwchaearn in the historic county of Montgomeryshire.  The township of Aberbechan was transferred to Bettws Cedewain and more recently moved, together  with the township of Dolforwyn, into the community of Abermule and Llandyssil in  Powys, Wales.

There is a chapel  The former township is also the home of Aberbechan Hall.

See also 
Aberbechan Hall

References

External links
Photos of Aberbechan and surrounding area on geograph
Aberbechan at Streetmap.co.uk

Townships in Montgomeryshire
Hamlets in Wales
Populated places in Powys